Changing Channels is the fourth solo album by dobro player Jerry Douglas, released in 1987 (see 1987 in music). It was his second release on the MCA label.

Track listing

Personnel
Jerry Douglas – dobro, lap steel guitar
Béla Fleck – banjo, mandolin
Russ Barenberg – guitar
Edgar Meyer – bass
Connie Ellisor – strings
Mark O'Connor – fiddle
Ricky Skaggs – fiddle
Glenn Worf – bass
Neil Worf – drums
Buck White – piano
Bessyl Duhon – accordion

References

1987 albums
Jerry Douglas albums
MCA Records albums